Elgar Graeme Watts (born 24 September 1985) is a South African professional rugby union player who played for the , ,  and  domestically and for the  and the  in Super Rugby. His usual position is fly-half.

Career

Maties

Watts started his career playing rugby for University of Stellenbosch side , representing them at the 2006 National Club Championships held in Stellenbosch.

Boland Cavaliers

Just a quarter of an hour into his debut, he scored his first points for the Cavaliers, kicking a drop goal in the 78th minute to help his side to a 31–22 victory. He started that match as fly-half, but could not prevent Free State running out 35–20 winners to eliminate Boland from the competition.

He started 11 of their 14 matches during the season and played off the bench in a further two matches. Watts scored four tries and kicked one conversion in the first leg of the play-off to set up a 54–15 win for the side from Wellington; they remained in the Premier Division for 2009 despite a 42–50 loss in the second leg of the play-off.

Watts didn't feature in the 2009 Vodacom Cup competition, but returned to action for Boland in the 2009 Currie Cup Premier Division. Despite winning the first leg 36–35, they lost the second leg 3–40 in Witbank to be relegated to the First Division for 2010.

Pumas

He was used as a replacement for the remainder of the competition, playing off the bench on four occasions as the Pumas finished fifth on the log to miss out on a quarter final spot.

However, Watts was very much a key player in their 2010 Currie Cup Premier Division campaign; he featured in all fourteen of their matches, starting eleven of those. Watts finished the season as the top scorer for the Pumas with 104 points, which consisted of nine tries, 16 conversions and nine penalties.

Return to Boland Cavaliers

He was included in the 2011  Super Rugby squad, but failed to make an appearance. Instead, he started all seven of the ' matches in the 2011 Vodacom Cup competition.

After playing in a compulsory friendly match against Western Cape rivals  in June 2011, he featured in the most high-scoring season of his career; he scored 185 points in twelve appearances in the 2011 Currie Cup First Division to finish as the top scorer in the competition. The Boland Cavaliers won nine of their ten matches during the regular season – the only defeat being a 17–23 loss to the  – to finish top of the log and secure a home semi-final against the Griffons. Watts scored a try, six conversions and a penalty in a 50–20 win and also contributed 12 points in the final, a 43–12 victory over the Eastern Province Kings to help them win the First Division title for the second time in their history. Due to the Premier Division being reduced from eight teams to six for 2012, there was no possibility of promotion to that league.

Watts scored 49 points in his seven appearances – all with the boot – during the 2012 Vodacom Cup competition, again just missing out on the play-offs by finishing fifth, with Argentine side  edging them out on points differential after they finished level on 21 log points.

In June 2012, he was also named as the starting fly-half for a South African Barbarians (South) team that played against  during their 2012 tour of South Africa. Watts kicked three conversions in a 26–54 defeat in Kimberley.

Watts started nine of the Boland Cavaliers' fourteen matches during the season, with a thigh injury ruling him out of five matches. He still finished the season as his side's top scorer with 115 points, sixth overall in the competition. It turned out to be a disappointing season for the defending champions as they finished in sixth spot in the competition to miss out on the play-off altogether.

Watts left Boland Cavaliers at the end of the 2012 season, having scored 445 points in 75 matches in his two separate spells in Wellington, making him the fifth-highest points scorer in the team's history.

Free State Cheetahs / Cheetahs

Watts made the move to Bloemfontein to join the  prior to the 2013 Super Rugby season.

He shared the kicking duties with right winger Riaan Smit, contributing 63 points which included four tries to finish as the Cheetahs' second-highest scorer behind Smit who scored 70.

Watts moved up the pecking order for the 2014 Super Rugby season, being named the regular replacement for first-choice fly-half Johan Goosen. In July 2014, he was rewarded with a contract extension, committing him to the Cheetahs until 2016.

Griffons

Eastern Province Kings

References

External links
 
 itsrugby.co.uk Profile

South African rugby union players
Living people
1985 births
Boland Cavaliers players
Pumas (Currie Cup) players
Free State Cheetahs players
Cheetahs (rugby union) players
Sportspeople from Paarl
Rugby union fly-halves
Southern Kings players
Rugby union players from the Western Cape